Harry Clay Ransley (February 5, 1863 – November 7, 1941) was a Republican member of the United States House of Representatives from Pennsylvania, serving eight terms from 1921 to 1937.

Early life and career 
Harry Ransley was born in Philadelphia, Pennsylvania.  He served in the Pennsylvania State House of Representatives from 1891 to 1894.  He was a member of the Select Council of Philadelphia for sixteen years and president for eight years.  He was a delegate to the 1912 Republican National Convention.  He served as sheriff of Philadelphia County from 1916 to 1920.  He was chairman of the Republican city committee 1916 to 1919.

Congress 
Running as a Republican, in 1920, he sought election to the 66th United States Congress to fill the vacancy caused by the resignation of J. Hampton Moore. He won, and he was subsequently re-elected to the next seven sessions of Congress, serving from 1921 to 1937. He was an unsuccessful candidate for reelection in 1936, losing to Democrat Leon Sacks.

Death
He died on November 7, 1941 and was interred Interment at West Laurel Hill Cemetery in Bala Cynwyd, Pennsylvania.

Sources 

The Political Graveyard

External links 
 

Republican Party members of the Pennsylvania House of Representatives
Philadelphia City Council members
1863 births
1941 deaths
19th-century American Episcopalians
20th-century American Episcopalians
Sheriffs of Philadelphia
Politicians from Philadelphia
Republican Party members of the United States House of Representatives from Pennsylvania